Baranów  is a village in Grodzisk Mazowiecki County, Masovian Voivodeship, in east-central Poland. It is the seat of the gmina (administrative district) called Gmina Baranów.

References

Villages in Grodzisk Mazowiecki County